Scinax quinquefasciatus is a species of frog in the family Hylidae.
It is found in Colombia and Ecuador.
Its natural habitats are subtropical or tropical dry forests, subtropical or tropical moist lowland forests, subtropical or tropical moist shrubland, intermittent freshwater marshes, plantations, rural gardens, urban areas, heavily degraded former forest, ponds, and canals and ditches.

References

quinquefasciatus
Amphibians of Colombia
Amphibians of Ecuador
Amphibians described in 1913
Taxonomy articles created by Polbot